Kenneth Guy Gist Jr. (June 21, 1944 – March 27, 2018), known as Kenny O'Dell, was an American country music singer and songwriter, best known for writing the number-one country hits "Behind Closed Doors" (recorded by Charlie Rich, 1973) and "Mama He's Crazy" (The Judds, 1984). O'Dell was inducted into the Nashville Songwriters Hall of Fame.

Career
Early in his career, he worked with guitarist Duane Eddy, and his own band, Guys and Dolls. When O'Dell first moved to Nashville in 1969, he ran Bobby Goldsboro's publishing company.

He also wrote pop and soft rock songs, including "Next Plane to London", which was a Top 20 hit in 1967 for The Rose Garden. The Crickets recorded two of his songs in 1972 and 1973, namely "My Rockin' Days" and "Rock'n'Roll Man". Charlie Rich had a top 10 country hit in 1972 with the O'Dell song, "I Take It On Home". It was followed by "Behind Closed Doors", which won a Grammy Award in 1973 for Best Country & Western Recording.  O'Dell wrote or co-wrote the number-one country hits "Trouble in Paradise" (Loretta Lynn, 1974) and "Lizzie and the Rainman" (Tanya Tucker, 1975). His other top-10 hit was "What I've Got in Mind" (Billie Jo Spears, 1976).

As a performer, O'Dell had a top-40 pop hit with "Beautiful People", released in 1967. He later had five top-40 country hits, topped by the top-10 hit "Let's Shake Hands And Come Out Lovin'" in 1978. The follow-up, "As Long As I Can Wake Up In Your Arms" peaked at No. 12 in 1979.

Personal life and death
O'Dell's wife, guitarist Vivian J. "Corki" Ray (née Casey) Gist died at the age of 80 in 2017. The couple had three children.

O'Dell died of natural causes on March 27, 2018 in Cool Springs, Tennessee. He was 73.

Discography

Albums

Singles

Awards

1973—Grammy\Best Country Song\"Behind Closed Doors"
1973—CMA\Song of the Year\"Behind Closed Doors"
1973—CMA\Single of the Year\"Behind Closed Doors"
1973—ACM\Song of the Year\"Behind Closed Doors"
1973—ACM\Single of the Year\"Behind Closed Doors"
1984—Nashville Songwriters Association International\Songwriter of the Year
1984—NSAI\Song of the Year\"Mama He's Crazy"
1985—BMI\Country Song of the Year\"Mama He's Crazy"

References

External links
 Nashville Songwriters profile

1944 births
2018 deaths
American male singer-songwriters
American country singer-songwriters
Grammy Award winners
Capricorn Records artists
Epic Records artists
Singer-songwriters from Oklahoma
People from Antlers, Oklahoma
Country musicians from Oklahoma
White Whale Records artists